United Nations Security Council Resolution 400, adopted on December 7, 1976 in a closed meeting, after considering the recommendation of the appointment of the Secretary-General of the United Nations, the Council recommended to the General Assembly that Kurt Waldheim be appointed as Secretary-General for a second term beginning January 1, 1977 and ending December 31, 1981.

See also
 List of United Nations Security Council Resolutions 301 to 400 (1971–1976)
 List of Secretaries-General of the United Nations

References
Text of the Resolution at undocs.org

External links
 

 0400
 0400
December 1976 events